Frances Tasker Carter (1738 – October 31, 1787) was born in Annapolis, Maryland.  Her parents were Benjamin Tasker and Ann Bladen.  Benjamin was one of the richest men in the Province of Maryland and a president of the Maryland Council and Provincial Governor of Maryland.

Life
On April 2, 1754, Frances Tasker married Robert Carter of Virginia, the grandson of Robert "King" Carter of Corotoman, from whom he inherited a large estate called Nomini Hall. Robert and Frances Carter also had a house in Williamsburg. They owned a plantation where they had over 100 slaves. Robert was a member of the Virginia Council having been appointed by George II and later George III. They were one of the most wealthy families in all of Virginia.

Robert and Frances Carter had seventeen children, eleven of whom were living when Frances died.  The children's names, in order of birth, were Benjamin (born 1757), Robert, Priscilla, Anne, Rebecca, Frances, Betty, Mary, Harriet, Amelia, Rebecca Dulany, John, Sarah, Judith, George, Sophia, and Julia (born 1783).
 
Frances Carter died at Nomini Hall on October 31, 1787.

Descendants
Frances' granddaughter, Frances Tasker Ball, married the great-nephew of Fielding Lewis, I, the brother-in-law of President George Washington. Her great-granddaughter married Henry Augustine Tayloe II, who inherited Mount Airy, Richmond County, Virginia  from his father William Henry Tayloe brother of Henry Augustine Tayloe I, whose 2nd great aunt Sarah married George Washington's nephew William Augustine Washington, I. Henry's 2nd great aunt, Rebecca, married Francis "Lightfoot" Lee, whose 3rd cousin was President William Henry Harrison.

References

External links
Ogle Family web site

See also
Virginia Historical Society

American slave owners
Frances Anne Tasker
1738 births
1787 deaths
Tasker family
American women slave owners